PA3 may refer to:
 ALCO PA-3, a diesel locomotive
 Paranormal Activity 3, a 2011 American horror film
 Pennsylvania Route 3
 Pennsylvania's 3rd congressional district
 Pitcairn PA-3 Orowing, a biplane
 The PA3, a type of rolling stock used on the PATH train in New York and New Jersey
 PA3 key, on the IBM 3270 keyboard